The Dmitrov constituency (No.118) is a Russian legislative constituency in Moscow Oblast. The constituency previously covered most of northern Moscow Oblast. However, after 2015 redistricting it lost Klin to Krasnogorsk constituency and Sergiyev Posad to Sergiyev Posad constituency, in return Dmitrov constituency was stretched southwards to Khimki (Istra constituency) and Lobnya (Mytishchi constituency).

Members elected

Election results

1993

|-
! colspan=2 style="background-color:#E9E9E9;text-align:left;vertical-align:top;" |Candidate
! style="background-color:#E9E9E9;text-align:left;vertical-align:top;" |Party
! style="background-color:#E9E9E9;text-align:right;" |Votes
! style="background-color:#E9E9E9;text-align:right;" |%
|-
|style="background-color:"|
|align=left|Artur Muravyov
|align=left|Independent
|
|16.97%
|-
|style="background-color:"|
|align=left|Valery Galchenko
|align=left|Independent
| -
|10.70%
|-
| colspan="5" style="background-color:#E9E9E9;"|
|- style="font-weight:bold"
| colspan="3" style="text-align:left;" | Total
| 
| 100%
|-
| colspan="5" style="background-color:#E9E9E9;"|
|- style="font-weight:bold"
| colspan="4" |Source:
|
|}

1995

|-
! colspan=2 style="background-color:#E9E9E9;text-align:left;vertical-align:top;" |Candidate
! style="background-color:#E9E9E9;text-align:left;vertical-align:top;" |Party
! style="background-color:#E9E9E9;text-align:right;" |Votes
! style="background-color:#E9E9E9;text-align:right;" |%
|-
|style="background-color:"|
|align=left|Mikhail Men
|align=left|Yabloko
|
|17.77%
|-
|style="background-color:#DA2021"|
|align=left|Artur Muravyov (incumbent)
|align=left|Ivan Rybkin Bloc
|
|15.25%
|-
|style="background-color:"|
|align=left|Nikolay Solodnikov
|align=left|Independent
|
|12.40%
|-
|style="background-color:"|
|align=left|Vladimir Frolov
|align=left|Communist Party
|
|7.40%
|-
|style="background-color:#F9DA00"|
|align=left|Nikolay Pavlov
|align=left|National Republican Party
|
|5.28%
|-
|style="background-color:"|
|align=left|Yury Samsonov
|align=left|Independent
|
|4.65%
|-
|style="background-color:#D50000"|
|align=left|Aleksey Prigarin
|align=left|Communists and Working Russia - for the Soviet Union
|
|3.33%
|-
|style="background-color:"|
|align=left|Ivan Shkolnik
|align=left|Agrarian Party
|
|2.80%
|-
|style="background-color:#2C299A"|
|align=left|Yevgeny Mysyagin
|align=left|Congress of Russian Communities
|
|2.78%
|-
|style="background-color:"|
|align=left|Yevgeny Nikiforov
|align=left|Independent
|
|2.59%
|-
|style="background-color:#295EC4"|
|align=left|Yevgeny Fyodorov
|align=left|Party of Economic Freedom
|
|2.54%
|-
|style="background-color:"|
|align=left|Boris Mironov
|align=left|Independent
|
|2.54%
|-
|style="background-color:"|
|align=left|Aleksey Zuyev
|align=left|Liberal Democratic Party
|
|2.12%
|-
|style="background-color:#FF4400"|
|align=left|Aleksey Kretov
|align=left|Party of Workers' Self-Government
|
|1.63%
|-
|style="background-color:"|
|align=left|Pavel Sokolov
|align=left|Independent
|
|1.38%
|-
|style="background-color:#5A5A58"|
|align=left|Vladimir Alferov
|align=left|Federal Democratic Movement
|
|0.93%
|-
|style="background-color:#959698"|
|align=left|Valery Artemyev
|align=left|Derzhava
|
|0.81%
|-
|style="background-color:#F9E2E3"|
|align=left|Oleg Dalkarov
|align=left|Tikhonov-Tupolev-Tikhonov
|
|0.42%
|-
|style="background-color:#019CDC"|
|align=left|Anatoly Sliva
|align=left|Party of Russian Unity and Accord
|
|0.39%
|-
|style="background-color:"|
|align=left|Vera Ryabokon
|align=left|Zemsky Sobor
|
|0.22%
|-
|style="background-color:#000000"|
|colspan=2 |against all
|
|10.14%
|-
| colspan="5" style="background-color:#E9E9E9;"|
|- style="font-weight:bold"
| colspan="3" style="text-align:left;" | Total
| 
| 100%
|-
| colspan="5" style="background-color:#E9E9E9;"|
|- style="font-weight:bold"
| colspan="4" |Source:
|
|}

1999

|-
! colspan=2 style="background-color:#E9E9E9;text-align:left;vertical-align:top;" |Candidate
! style="background-color:#E9E9E9;text-align:left;vertical-align:top;" |Party
! style="background-color:#E9E9E9;text-align:right;" |Votes
! style="background-color:#E9E9E9;text-align:right;" |%
|-
|style="background-color:#3B9EDF"|
|align=left|Valery Galchenko
|align=left|Fatherland – All Russia
|
|23.38%
|-
|style="background-color:"|
|align=left|Aleksandr Korovnikov
|align=left|Independent
|
|18.30%
|-
|style="background-color:"|
|align=left|Aleksey Ivanenko
|align=left|Independent
|
|8.30%
|-
|style="background-color:"|
|align=left|Sergey Kryzhov
|align=left|Yabloko
|
|6.34%
|-
|style="background-color:"|
|align=left|Sergey Bedov
|align=left|Independent
|
|5.01%
|-
|style="background-color:"|
|align=left|Yevgeny Fyodorov
|align=left|Our Home – Russia
|
|4.57%
|-
|style="background-color:"|
|align=left|Yelena Vyalbe
|align=left|The Greens
|
|3.72%
|-
|style="background-color:#1042A5"|
|align=left|Lev Ponomaryov
|align=left|Union of Right Forces
|
|3.32%
|-
|style="background-color:"|
|align=left|Gennady Yevdokimov
|align=left|Independent
|
|1.54%
|-
|style="background-color:#CC0000"|
|align=left|Vladimir Mukusev
|align=left|Social-Democrats
|
|0.82%
|-
|style="background-color:"|
|align=left|Vladimir Suntsov
|align=left|Independent
|
|0.70%
|-
|style="background-color:#FCCA19"|
|align=left|Dmitry Shmelkov
|align=left|Congress of Russian Communities-Yury Boldyrev Movement
|
|0.68%
|-
|style="background-color:"|
|align=left|Igor Malkov
|align=left|Independent
|
|0.65%
|-
|style="background-color:"|
|align=left|Aleksey Shornikov
|align=left|Independent
|
|0.56%
|-
|style="background-color:#084284"|
|align=left|Sergey Yermoshkin
|align=left|Spiritual Heritage
|
|0.36%
|-
|style="background-color:"|
|align=left|Aleksey Lysanov
|align=left|Independent
|
|0.16%
|-
|style="background-color:#000000"|
|colspan=2 |against all
|
|18.90%
|-
| colspan="5" style="background-color:#E9E9E9;"|
|- style="font-weight:bold"
| colspan="3" style="text-align:left;" | Total
| 
| 100%
|-
| colspan="5" style="background-color:#E9E9E9;"|
|- style="font-weight:bold"
| colspan="4" |Source:
|
|}

2003

|-
! colspan=2 style="background-color:#E9E9E9;text-align:left;vertical-align:top;" |Candidate
! style="background-color:#E9E9E9;text-align:left;vertical-align:top;" |Party
! style="background-color:#E9E9E9;text-align:right;" |Votes
! style="background-color:#E9E9E9;text-align:right;" |%
|-
|style="background-color:#FFD700"|
|align=left|Valery Galchenko (incumbent)
|align=left|People's Party
|
|49.88%
|-
|style="background-color:#00A1FF"|
|align=left|Aleksandr Romanovich
|align=left|Party of Russia's Rebirth-Russian Party of Life
|
|10.09%
|-
|style="background-color:"|
|align=left|Sergey Mukhin
|align=left|Communist Party
|
|5.47%
|-
|style="background:#1042A5"| 
|align=left|Nikolay Salomatin
|align=left|Union of Right Forces
|
|4.29%
|-
|style="background-color:#164C8C"|
|align=left|Galina Kulagina
|align=left|United Russian Party Rus'
|
|3.48%
|-
|style="background-color:"|
|align=left|Yevgeny Fyodorov
|align=left|Independent
|
|2.44%
|-
|style="background-color:"|
|align=left|Vladimir Kaverin
|align=left|Agrarian Party
|
|2.35%
|-
|style="background-color:"|
|align=left|Mikhail Kaganovich
|align=left|Independent
|
|0.68%
|-
|style="background-color:#000000"|
|colspan=2 |against all
|
|19.01%
|-
| colspan="5" style="background-color:#E9E9E9;"|
|- style="font-weight:bold"
| colspan="3" style="text-align:left;" | Total
| 
| 100%
|-
| colspan="5" style="background-color:#E9E9E9;"|
|- style="font-weight:bold"
| colspan="4" |Source:
|
|}

2016

|-
! colspan=2 style="background-color:#E9E9E9;text-align:left;vertical-align:top;" |Candidate
! style="background-color:#E9E9E9;text-align:left;vertical-align:top;" |Party
! style="background-color:#E9E9E9;text-align:right;" |Votes
! style="background-color:#E9E9E9;text-align:right;" |%
|-
|style="background-color: " |
|align=left|Irina Rodnina
|align=left|United Russia
|
|45.25%
|-
|style="background-color:"|
|align=left|Mikhail Avdeyev
|align=left|Communist Party
|
|11.66%
|-
|style="background-color:"|
|align=left|Viktoria Dmitriyeva
|align=left|Liberal Democratic Party
|
|8.77%
|-
|style="background-color:"|
|align=left|Vyacheslav Belousov
|align=left|A Just Russia
|
|6.90%
|-
|style="background-color:"|
|align=left|Mikhail Zernov
|align=left|Independent
|
|6.43%
|-
|style="background:"| 
|align=left|Boris Nadezhdin
|align=left|Party of Growth
|
|5.45%
|-
|style="background-color:"|
|align=left|Dmitry Trunin
|align=left|Yabloko
|
|4.52%
|-
|style="background:"| 
|align=left|Vladimir Ryazanov
|align=left|Communists of Russia
|
|3.54%
|-
|style="background:"| 
|align=left|Stanislav Bychinsky
|align=left|Patriots of Russia
|
|2.00%
|-
|style="background-color:"|
|align=left|Yury Vzyatyshev
|align=left|The Greens
|
|1.48%
|-
| colspan="5" style="background-color:#E9E9E9;"|
|- style="font-weight:bold"
| colspan="3" style="text-align:left;" | Total
| 
| 100%
|-
| colspan="5" style="background-color:#E9E9E9;"|
|- style="font-weight:bold"
| colspan="4" |Source:
|
|}

2021

|-
! colspan=2 style="background-color:#E9E9E9;text-align:left;vertical-align:top;" |Candidate
! style="background-color:#E9E9E9;text-align:left;vertical-align:top;" |Party
! style="background-color:#E9E9E9;text-align:right;" |Votes
! style="background-color:#E9E9E9;text-align:right;" |%
|-
|style="background-color:"|
|align=left|Irina Rodnina (incumbent)
|align=left|United Russia
|
|40.89%
|-
|style="background-color:"|
|align=left|Boris Nadezhdin
|align=left|A Just Russia — For Truth
|
|17.12%
|-
|style="background-color:"|
|align=left|Aleksandr Kornev
|align=left|Communist Party
|
|12.33%
|-
|style="background:"| 
|align=left|Andrey Litvinov
|align=left|Communists of Russia
|
|5.09%
|-
|style="background-color: " |
|align=left|Pavel Kolosok
|align=left|New People
|
|5.03%
|-
|style="background-color:"|
|align=left|Aleksey Sokov
|align=left|Liberal Democratic Party
|
|3.98%
|-
|style="background-color: "|
|align=left|Daniil Ovsyannikov
|align=left|Party of Pensioners
|
|3.85%
|-
|style="background: "| 
|align=left|Yaroslav Nekrasov
|align=left|Yabloko
|
|2.14%
|-
|style="background-color:"|
|align=left|Larisa Kosyuk
|align=left|The Greens
|
|1.99%
|-
|style="background: "| 
|align=left|Gennady Bichev
|align=left|Russian Party of Freedom and Justice
|
|1.77%
|-
|style="background-color:"|
|align=left|Semyon Ulanovsky
|align=left|Rodina
|
|1.28%
|-
| colspan="5" style="background-color:#E9E9E9;"|
|- style="font-weight:bold"
| colspan="3" style="text-align:left;" | Total
| 
| 100%
|-
| colspan="5" style="background-color:#E9E9E9;"|
|- style="font-weight:bold"
| colspan="4" |Source:
|
|}

Notes

References

Russian legislative constituencies
Politics of Moscow Oblast